Old Deer Park is an area of open space within Richmond, owned by the Crown Estate, in the London Borough of Richmond upon Thames, England. Despite the name, there are now no deer in the park.

Location
The park is bounded generally by the Thames to the west, Kew Gardens to the north and, across a trunk road, urban areas of Richmond town to the east and south. Owned by the Crown Estate, the park forms part of a larger retained historic and biodiverse landscape incorporating part of Richmond, Kew and Isleworth. The lowest, western parts of the park constitute flood storage areas, which provide emergency flood relief around Richmond semi-tidally submerged Lock.

Old Deer Park's heritage as a historic royal landscape in a favoured riverside location has become compromised over recent decades by instances of inappropriate recreational and parking development, general neglect, and insufficient control of tree planting. A long-term strategy is now being implemented to arrest and reverse this decline.

History
In the mid-16th century, Richmond Palace was a favourite residence of Queen Elizabeth I and in 1574 she granted "Our park of Isleworth otherwise called the Newe Parke of Richmonde" to Edward Bacon. This statement was made even though Isleworth parish and manor lay on the Middlesex bank opposite the Surrey bank of Richmond — the Abbey of Syon in Isleworth was tied to that  of Sheen on the other respective bank, which had jointly for centuries owned the estate.

Queen Elizabeth died at Richmond in 1603. This then became known as The New Park of Richmond. The present name "Old Deer Park" was adopted after 1637 when James's son King Charles I established the much larger Richmond Park on the other side of the town. During the eighteenth century Richmond Lodge was located in the Park, which served as the summer home of George, Prince of Wales (the future George II) and his wife Princess Caroline following their dispute with his father George I.

The majority of park is now occupied by the Royal Mid-Surrey Golf Club, and this has been so since 1892. Within the club's boundaries are two 18-hole courses, plus a separate area within which lies the Grade I listed King's Observatory, established by King George III in 1769. To the south-west of the Observatory, under the fairway of the 14th hole of the outer golf course, lie the foundations of the former Carthusian Sheen Priory, founded by Henry V in 1414.

Construction of the railway line westwards from Richmond Station in 1847/8 restricted the access from Richmond Green to Old Deer Park, except for one narrow bridge. Eighty-five years later a new arterial road (the "Great Chertsey Road"), complete with a high ramped approach to a new bridge over the Thames (Twickenham Bridge – built in 1933), was also constructed across the southern end of the park, close to and roughly parallel with the railway. This heightened the sense of separation between town and park – alleviating this problem is also part of the new strategy.

Beside the River Thames in the park are a pair of stone obelisks. They were built in 1769 and were originally used by the King's Observatory to observe the transit of Venus across the Sun that year.

The park was used to accommodate 5,000 of the 8,000 Scouts attending the 1st World Scout Jamboree in 1920. The public open spaces are occasionally used for circuses,  funfairs and other events.

Cricket ground

Old Deer Park has been used a venue for cricket since at least 1867, when Richmond played a United South of England Eleven. During its history, the ground has played host to a number of Middlesex Second XI and Surrey Second XI matches.

Despite historically being within Surrey, the ground has played host to List-A matches involving Middlesex, the first of which saw them Nottinghamshire in the 2000 Norwich Union National League. In 2001 the Middlesex Cricket Board played their only List-A match at the ground in the 2001 Cheltenham & Gloucester Trophy against Berkshire.  From 2000 to 2004, the ground held 5 List-A matches, the last of which saw Middlesex play Scotland in the 2004 totesport League.

Starting in the 2003 Twenty20 Cup against Kent, Middlesex have used the ground for six Twenty20 matches to date.

In local domestic cricket, the ground is the home venue of Richmond Cricket Club.

Main elements of the park
Accessed from the A316:
Informal sport area, with open recreation areas, football, rugby and other pitches
Royal Mid-Surrey Golf Club courses
King's Observatory
Richmond Athletic Ground, home to Richmond rugby club
Richmond Swimming Pool & Lido, now called Pools on the Park
Public car park and miscellaneous commercial buildings
Accessed from the A307:
Sports Ground with rugby, cricket, tennis, archery and bowls

References

External links
London Borough of Richmond upon Thames: Old Deer Park

1603 establishments in England
Cricket grounds in London
Deer hunting
Obelisks in England
Old Deer Park
Parks and open spaces in the London Borough of Richmond upon Thames
Rugby union stadiums in London
Sport in the London Borough of Richmond upon Thames
Sports venues completed in 1867